Capacitation is the penultimate step in the maturation of mammalian spermatozoa and is required to render them competent to fertilize an oocyte. This step is a biochemical event; the sperm move normally and look mature prior to capacitation.
In vivo, capacitation occurs after ejaculation, when the spermatozoa leave the vagina and enter the superior female reproductive tract. The uterus aids in the steps of capacitation by secreting sterol-binding albumin, lipoproteins, and proteolytic and glycosidasic enzymes such as heparin.

For purposes of in vitro fertilization, capacitation occurs by incubating spermatozoa that have either undergone ejaculation or have been extracted from the epididymis and incubated in a defined medium for several hours. There are different techniques to perform the capacitation step: simple washing, migration (swim-up), density gradients, and filter. The objective is to isolate as many motile spermatozoa as possible and to eliminate non-motile or dead spermatozoa. After either in vivo or in vitro capacitation the sperm must undergo the final maturation step, activation, involving the acrosome reaction.

Non-mammalian spermatozoa do not require this capacitation step and are ready to fertilize an oocyte immediately after release from the male.

Function and mechanism 
Capacitation has two effects: destabilisation of the acrosomal sperm head membrane which allows it to penetrate the outer layer of the egg, and chemical changes in the tail that allow a greater mobility in the sperm. The changes are facilitated by the removal of sterols (e.g. cholesterol) and non-covalently bound epididymal/seminal glycoproteins. The result is a more fluid membrane with an increased permeability to Ca2+ ion.

An influx of Ca2+ produces increased intracellular cAMP levels and thus, an increase in motility. Hyperactivation coincides with the onset of capacitation and is the result of the increased Ca2+ levels. It has a synergistic stimulatory effect with adenosine that increases adenylyl cyclase activity in the sperm.

The tripeptide fertilization promoting peptide (FPP) is essential for controlling capacitation. FPP is produced in the prostate gland as a component of the seminal fluid. FPP comes into contact with the spermatozoa during ejaculation, as the sperm and seminal fluid mix. High levels of active FPP prevent capacitation. After ejaculation, the concentration of FPP drops in the female reproductive tract.

Induction 
Because assisted reproductive technologies, or ARTs, such as in vitro fertilization (IVF) or intrauterine insemination (IUI) require the induction of sperm cell capacitation outside of normal biological parameters, numerous methods have been developed to induce this process in mammalian sperm cells. Sperm cells are harvested through ejaculation or harvested from the caudal epididymis and allowed to liquefy at room temperature. Capacitation can then be induced by adding media designed to mimic the electrolytic composition of the fallopian tubes, where fertilization occurs. These media vary between species, but are saline-based and contain energy substrates such as lactate, pyruvate, and possibly glucose. A cholesterol acceptor is required to facilitate the removal of cholesterol from the sperm cell membrane, which is always albumin. Bovine serum albumin is typically used for in vitro animal studies, and human serum albumin (HSA) is used in human sperm capacitation induction.

Bicarbonate is a vital component of capacitation-inducing media, as it is co-transported into the cytosol where it activates soluble adenylyl cyclase (sAC) as well as acts as a pH buffer necessary to prevent decreasing the pH in the culture, a necessary addition when incubating cells at 5% CO2 as is generally used although not required. Calcium chloride is added to facilitated the influx via of calcium cations. In animal models, Tyrode's albumin lactate pyruvate (TALP) medium is typically used as a base, which contains each of these components. In humans, human tubal fluid (HTF) is used.

These media can be supplemented with other chemicals to induce hyperactivated sperm motility and/or the acrosome reaction. For animal in vitro fertilization, caffeine at 5 mM concentration is a strong inducer of sperm capacitation in vitro. Calcium ionophores are also ideal to induce capacitation. Adding heparin to capacitation inducing medium mimics the secretion of heparin-like gycosaminoglycans (GAGs) near the oocyte and initiates the acrosome reaction. This effect is magnified when adding lysophosphatidylcholine (LC) in conjunction with heparin. Catecholamines such as norepinephrine at low concentrations have been shown to assist in acrosome reaction induction.

In vitro capacitation techniques

The traditional methods to perform in vitro capacitation are:

Simple wash: this method only eliminates seminal plasma, it does not select the best spermatozoa. The sample is centrifuged and then, the supernatant is eliminated. It is used in severe oligozoospermia, criptozoospermia or testis biopsy samples. It is performed before other capacitation techniques too.

Migration (swim-up). Firstly, centrifugation takes place and seminal plasma is eliminated. Then, 0.5 -1 ml of culture medium is added at the top and after the incubation period at 37°C, the best motile spermatozoa will have ascend from the bottom to the top of the tube (healthy spermatozoa go to the culture medium). In order to obtain the fraction rich in spermatozoa, the top layer is collected. It is still widely used and useful in normozoospermia. It allows to obtain fractions with more than 90% of PR spermatozoa. 

Density gradients. In this technique, a tube is filled with layers of liquids of different densities and semen is placed on the top layer. Then, The tube goes through a centrifugation to filter cell debris and non motile cells. After the centrifugation, healthy sperm are on the very bottom layer of the liquid in the tube, while debris and non-motile spermatozoa are in upper layers. This procedure takes approximately 60 minutes and it is specially indicated in oligozoospermia, asthenozoospermia and abundant debris samples. At the end, all the cells will arrive to the bottom, but those with more motility will arrive sooner. This procedure is often called just the "Percoll method", since Percoll was frequently used as the density medium, but other density mediums are now used.

Filtration. It consist in a filter that does not allow every sperm to pass. It is less used nowadays and only spermatozoa with better motility will pass through the filter. 
However, nowadays there are new techniques which surpass these ones. For instance, we have PICSI, MACS or microfluidic chips.

Measurement 
Numerous methods have been developed to assess the degree to which sperm cells are undergoing capacitation in vitro. Computer-aided sperm analysis (CASA) was developed in the 1980s for measuring sperm kinematics. CASA uses phase-contrast microscopy combined with sperm tracking software to analyze sperm motility parameters. Certain parameters such as curvilinear velocity (VCL), straightline velocity (VSL), average path velocity (VAP), and the amplitude of lateral head displacement (ALH) have been shown to be positively correlated with the acquisition of fertilization competency and are thus used to identify hyperactive sperm cell motility.

While motility measurements are critical for identifying the presence of hyperactive motility, additional methods have been developed to identify the occurrence of the acrosome reaction. A simple method uses Coomassie brilliant blue G250 to stain cells, providing visual evidence of intact or reacted acrosomes. More advanced techniques employ fluorescent or electron microscopy methods. Fluorescein-conjugated Peanut agglutinin (FITC-PNA) or Pisum sativum agglutinin (FITC-PSA) can be used to fluorescently tag the acrosome of sperm cells, which can be then used to assess the status of the acrosome using a fluorescent microscope.

Discovery
The discovery of this process was independently reported in 1951 by both Min Chueh Chang and Colin Russell Austin.

See also 
Cortical reaction
Acrosome reaction

References

Further reading

External links 
 

Mammal reproductive system
Germ cells
Andrology